Little Stonham, also known as Stonham Parva, is a village and civil parish in the Mid Suffolk district of Suffolk in eastern England. Located just off the A140, around three miles east of Stowmarket, in 2005 its population was 350.

St Mary the Virgin's Church in the village is a redundant Anglican church.  It has been designated by English Heritage as a Grade I listed building, and is under the care of the Churches Conservation Trust.

References

External links

Villages in Suffolk
Civil parishes in Suffolk
Mid Suffolk District